Maya Kasandra Soetoro-Ng (born August 15, 1970) is an Indonesian-born American academic, who is a faculty specialist at the Spark M. Matsunaga Institute for Peace and Conflict Resolution, based in the College of Social Sciences at the University of Hawaiʻi at Mānoa. She is also a consultant for the Obama Foundation, working to develop the Asia-Pacific Leaders Program. Formerly a high school history teacher, Soetoro-Ng is the maternal half-sister of Barack Obama, the 44th president of the United States.

Early life and education
Soetoro-Ng was born in Saint Carolus Hospital, a Catholic hospital, in Jakarta, Indonesia, the daughter of American cultural anthropologist Ann Dunham, an American of Swiss, German, Irish, Scottish, Welsh and English descent and Chinese-Indonesian businessman Lolo Soetoro. Her elder half-brother is the 44th president of the United States, Barack Obama. She has said she was named after American poet Maya Angelou.

Soetoro-Ng and Obama spent several years together in Indonesia and in Hawaii before her mother decided to return to Indonesia with her. After her parents divorced in 1980, her father remarried. From this marriage, Soetoro-Ng has another half-brother, Yusuf Aji Soetoro (b. 1981) and a half-sister, Rahayu Nurmaida Soetoro (b. 1984).

While living in Indonesia, Soetoro-Ng was home-schooled by her mother. From 1981 to 1984, Soetoro-Ng attended Jakarta International School. Like Obama, Soetoro-Ng returned to Hawaii and attended the private Punahou School in Honolulu, Hawaii, graduating in 1988.

Soetoro-Ng received her B.A. degree from Barnard College of Columbia University. She then received an M.A. in secondary language studies and an M.A. in Secondary Education from New York University. In 2006, she received a Ph.D. in international comparative education from the University of Hawai'i at Manoa.

Soetoro-Ng has often spoken warmly about her relationship with her older half-brother, which she says has remained strong even though they have often lived far apart. As adults, they have often celebrated Christmas in Hawaii, and savor the time they spend with their families together.

Career
Soetoro-Ng is currently a faculty specialist for the Spark M. Matsunaga Institute for Peace and Conflict Resolution, which is based in the College of Social Sciences at the University of Hawaii at Manoa, as well as a consultant for the Obama Foundation's Leaders Program: Asia-Pacific. Dr. Soetoro-Ng teaches courses on: Peace Education; the History of Peace Movements; and Leadership for Social Change.  She also oversees externships for undergraduates who are majoring or minoring in Peace Studies and coordinates the institute's community and global service learning programs.

Soetoro-Ng was an assistant professor at the Institute for Teacher Education at the University of Hawai'i College of Education and continues to do some consulting work, promoting international exchange and understanding, in partnership with the East West Center.  She authored a children's book, Ladder to the Moon, that was inspired by her mother and her daughter, Suhaila; it was published in 2011. She is working on a book about peace education and a young adult novel entitled Yellowood.

Soetoro-Ng was a high school history teacher at La Pietra: Hawaii School for Girls and the Education Laboratory School, both in Honolulu, Hawaii.  She previously taught and developed curriculum at The Learning Project, an alternative public middle school in New York City, from 1996 to 2000.

In 2009, Soetoro-Ng helped bring her mother's dissertation to publication in the form of the book Surviving against the Odds: Village Industry in Indonesia. She wrote a foreword to the book and participated in its launch at the American Anthropological Association annual meeting.

In 2019, Soetoro-Ng, along with Todd Shuster and Jennifer Gates cofounded The Peace Studio: a non-profit organization whose mission is to support, train and unite the next generation of artists, journalists and storytellers to inspire people everywhere to become active peacebuilders.

Research
Soetoro-Ng's doctoral research at the University of Hawaii at Manoa focused on Multicultural and International Education. She examined the use of narrative to develop more complex understandings of identity in multicultural classrooms. She promoted the learning of Social Studies—history and current events—from multiple perspectives. She has developed and implemented peace education curricula in public high schools and for K-12 teachers in Colleges of Education.  With partner Kerrie Urosevich, she founded the nonprofit Ceeds of Peace (ceedsofpeace.org), which connects families, community leaders and educators in a 360 degree approach to raise and educate peacebuilding leaders. With environmental law professor Maxine Burkett, she co-founded the nonprofit, Institute for Climate and Peace (www.climateandpeace.org) which works for climate justice at the intersection of climate change and positive peacebuilding.

Obama presidential campaigns
In May 2007, Soetoro-Ng announced that she would assist Obama in his campaign for presidency, and took two months off to campaign for him. She participated in the 2008 Democratic National Convention, where she spoke briefly about growing up with her brother and brought an Asian-American presence to the stage.

Soetoro-Ng also spoke briefly about the Obama administration's accomplishments at the 2012 Democratic National Convention in Charlotte, North Carolina, on September 4, 2012, sharing the podium with First Lady Michelle Obama's older brother, former Oregon State University men's basketball team head coach, Craig Robinson.

Personal life
In 2003, Maya Soetoro married Konrad Ng (Simplified Chinese: 吴加儒), a Chinese Canadian from Burlington, Ontario, Canada. Ng, who is of Malaysian Chinese descent, is now also a US citizen. He was the director of the Smithsonian Asian Pacific American Center and an assistant professor at the University of Hawaii's Academy of Creative Media. He is now the executive director of the Doris Duke Shangri La Center for Islamic Arts and Culture in Hawaii in Honolulu, Hawaii. They have two daughters, Suhaila and Savita.

Soetoro-Ng has described herself as "philosophically Buddhist". She speaks Indonesian, Spanish, and English.

See also 
 Family of Barack Obama

Bibliography 
 Ladder to the Moon (2011) – a children's book narrated by Maya Soetoro-Ng and illustrated by Yuyi Morales. The title of the book is taken from the 1958 Georgia O'Keeffe painting, which was depicted on a postcard the author was given by her mother.
 Mixed: Portraits of Multiracial Kids by Kip Fulbeck (2010) – Soetoro-Ng is credited with writing the foreword.

References

External links 

 University of Hawaii at Manoa
 College of Social Sciences, University of Hawaii at Manoa
 Public Policy Center, College of Social Sciences, University of Hawaii at Manoa
 Spark M. Matsunaga Institute for Peace & Conflict Resolution, Public Policy Center, College of Social Sciences, University of Hawaii at Manoa

1970 births
American Buddhists
Indonesian Buddhists
American people of English descent
American people of German descent
American people of Irish descent
American people of Indonesian descent
Indo people
Indonesian people of English descent
Indonesian people of German descent
Indonesian people of Irish descent
Schoolteachers from Hawaii
American women educators
Barnard College alumni
Living people
New York University alumni
Obama family
People from Honolulu
People from Jakarta
Punahou School alumni
University of Hawaiʻi at Mānoa alumni
University of Hawaiʻi faculty
Writers from Hawaii